Jon Asher Wolff (September 25, 1956 –  April 17, 2020) was an American geneticist. He was the lead author on a 1990 study published in the journal Science that first suggested the possibility of synthesizing mRNA in a laboratory to trigger the production of a desired protein. As of 2021, the article has been cited in the scholarly press more than 630 times and been described, by Nature, as "the first step toward making a vaccine from mRNA".

Wolff was born in Bayside, Queens, New York, in 1956, received his undergraduate education at Cornell University and earned an MD from Johns Hopkins University. He was a professor of medicine at the University of Wisconsin and later founder of the biotechnology firm Mirus Bio. He died in Denver, Colorado, from esophageal cancer at age 63.

References

1956 births
2020 deaths
Cornell University alumni
Johns Hopkins University alumni
University of Wisconsin–Madison faculty
American geneticists